The Morland Dynasty is a series of historical novels by Cynthia Harrod-Eagles, in the genre of a family saga. They recount the lives of the Morland family of York, England and their national and international relatives and associates.

There are currently 35 books in the series. The first book begins in 1434 and features the Wars of the Roses; the most recent book begins in the 1931 and deals with the Great Depression. The book series in order according to the author's webpage:

See also
Cultural depictions of Henry VIII of England
Cynthia Harrod-Eagles

External links
 http://www.cynthiaharrodeagles.com - The author's website.
 http://www.littlebrown.co.uk/Authors/H/173 - Publisher Little, Brown.
 http://www.goodreads.com/book/show/970918.The_Cause - Independent book review
 https://groups.yahoo.com/group/morlandplace - discussion group run by Morland fans for Morland fans

Book series introduced in 1980
Family saga novels
Historical novels
Cultural depictions of George IV
Novel series
Novels set in York
Novels set in the 15th century
Novels set in the 16th century
Novels set in the 17th century
Novels set in the 18th century
Novels set in the 19th century
Novels set in the 20th century